Ventura Boulevard is one of the primary east–west thoroughfares in the San Fernando Valley region of the City of Los Angeles, California. Ventura Boulevard is one of the oldest routes in the San Fernando Valley as it was originally a part of the Camino Real (the trail between Spanish missions). It was also U.S. Route 101 (US 101) before the freeway (which it parallels for much of Ventura Boulevard's length) was built, and it was also previously signed as U.S. Route 101 Business (US 101 Bus.).

The Boulevard begins near Calabasas in Woodland Hills at an intersection with Valley Circle Boulevard, travels through Tarzana, Encino, Sherman Oaks, and finally, in Studio City (where it intersects with Lankershim Boulevard), it becomes Cahuenga Boulevard, which then winds through Cahuenga Pass into Hollywood.

It has always been the most concentrated location for small businesses and shops in the Valley; nowadays it has pockets of housing, mini-malls, and shops, along with a wide assortment of businesses, schools, and other establishments. Homes south of Ventura Boulevard are considered to be among the most expensive in Los Angeles County, ranging from $2 million to $50 million and home to numerous celebrities, executives, athletes, and entertainers alike.

History
Due to natural springs, one of the first inhabited areas of the San Fernando Valley was the land around what is now known as Los Encinos State Historic Park, at the corner of Balboa and Ventura boulevards, which was inhabited by the Tongva Indians possibly for thousands of years. This five-acre (2 hm²) park now includes the original nine-room De La Osa Adobe (built in 1849) and a reservoir shaped like a Spanish guitar that collects the springwater.

The Valley's first golf course opened at the corner of Ventura and Coldwater Canyon in 1922 (this is now the site of the Sportsmen's Lodge).

Also in 1922, around the area of Canoga Avenue south of Ventura Boulevard, Victor Girard purchased 2,886 acres (12 km²) of land and planted over 120,000 pepper, sycamore, and eucalyptus trees, later resulting in the appropriately named Woodland Hills.

In 1928, just a couple blocks east of Laurel Canyon, Mack Sennett created his 38-acre (15.4 hm²) Keystone Studios, which produced silent movies with stars such as Fatty Arbuckle, W.C. Fields, Stan Laurel, and the Keystone Kops. After talkies, Keystone became Republic Pictures, and then in 1963 CBS Studio Center. Although closed to the public, this complex, which is located only a few blocks away from Ventura Boulevard, probably makes more TV sitcoms than any other studio.

In 2015 the Studio City section of Ventura Boulevard, along with Lankershim Boulevard, was the site of CicLAvia, an event sponsored by the Los Angeles County Metropolitan Transportation Authority in which major roads are temporarily closed to motorized vehicle traffic and used for recreational human-powered transport.

Public transportation

Ventura Boulevard carries Metro Local lines 150 and 240.

In popular culture

Music
The Everly Brothers recorded a song called "Ventura Boulevard" on their 1968 album Roots. 

Ventura Boulevard is mentioned in Tom Petty's song "Free Fallin'" ("All the vampires walkin' through the valley, Move west down Ventura Boulevard..."). When Petty died in 2017, what was intended as a walk by four fans turned into a public memorial as 10 times that many ‘Vampires’ walked west down the Boulevard in memory of the singer.

The Boulevard is also mentioned in Frank Zappa's "Valley Girl" ("On Ventura, there she goes, she just bought some bitchin' clothes") a song about a valley girl (voiced by his daughter Moon Zappa) who lives in Encino and participates in typical Valley Girl activities such as shopping at The Galleria, not wanting to do the dishes, and getting her toenails professionally pedicured.

Guitarist John 5 made a song entitled "18969 Ventura Blvd."

In the documentary Living with Michael Jackson, it is revealed that Michael Jackson wrote the song Billie Jean while riding down Ventura Boulevard in his car.

Haim's music video "Want You Back" is filmed on Ventura Boulevard.

Film
The boulevard is a prominent location in the movie The 40-Year-Old Virgin. Much of the films Crash and Transformers were filmed on the boulevard.

Television
In the Seinfeld episode "The Trip, Part 2", Jerry and George were said to be calling from a pay phone on Ventura Boulevard. In reality, the pay phone shown was on Ventura Place, about one block away.

In the Treehouse of Horror VI episode of The Simpsons, Ventura Boulevard features as the location of the show's first ever live-action scene.

Steve Allen, who lived in Encino, famously joked that "The Valley is the hippest part of town. They even named a boulevard after Charlie Ventura," referring to the renowned jazz saxophonist.

Literature

Pulp fiction author Raymond Chandler on Ventura Boulevard from his novel The Little Sister (1949):

Video games
Video game developer Infinity Ward, which developed most of the games in the Call of Duty series, has its headquarters on Ventura Boulevard. The studios can be seen at 15821 Ventura Boulevard, Encino.

Business district
The Ventura Business District is the commercial district along and around Ventura Boulevard. Ventura Boulevard and the district run along the northern base of the Santa Monica Mountains, following the former route of the colonial El Camino Real.

Neighborhoods 

Due to the district's extended linear size, it is rare for it to be considered one unified district, instead identified by neighborhoods within and along it.
They include:
Studio City 
Sherman Oaks
Encino
Tarzana
Woodland Hills

See also

History of the San Fernando Valley to 1915
Index: San Fernando Valley

Gallery of places along Ventura Boulevard (east to west)

References

External links

Streets in the San Fernando Valley
Streets in Los Angeles
Streets in Los Angeles County, California
Boulevards in the United States
U.S. Route 101
Encino, Los Angeles
Sherman Oaks, Los Angeles
Studio City, Los Angeles
Tarzana, Los Angeles
Woodland Hills, Los Angeles
San Fernando Valley